Jeffrey Potter was an Australian Rules footballer for the Port Adelaide Football Club between 1959 and 1970. He played in four premierships and was the club's leading goal kicker during the 1964 SANFL season.

References

1941 births
Port Adelaide Football Club (SANFL) players
Port Adelaide Football Club players (all competitions)
South Australian Football Hall of Fame inductees
Australian rules footballers from South Australia
Living people